Dark chocolate is a form of chocolate containing cocoa solids and cocoa butter without the milk or butter found in milk chocolate. Dark chocolate without added sweetener is known as bitter chocolate or unsweetened chocolate.

Government and industry standards of what products may be labeled "dark chocolate" vary by country and market.

There is no high-quality evidence for any health effects of dark chocolate, such as on blood pressure.

History 

Chocolate is made from the tropical Theobroma cacao tree seeds. Chocolate has been around for over 3,000 years. It was developed around 1900 B.C in Central and South America as a drink. Later, it was also made into a drink for the Mayan peoples for ceremonial purposes.

The Spanish encountered chocolate in the early 1500s and brought it back to Europe. They would add honey and cane sugar to make it sweeter, and other additional flavourings. They would also use boiling water instead of cold water to make the first hot chocolate drinks. Soon after, in the late 1600s, milk was also added to the dark chocolate beverage by Hans Sloane, who resided in Jamaica at the time. Chocolate was finally made into a solid form in the 18th century and started to be mass-produced in the 19th century, thanks to several innovations, in particular by Van Houten and Lindt.

In the late 19th century, thanks to innovations by Daniel Peter and Henri Nestlé, milk chocolate became a new type of chocolate, which would quickly become popular. As a consequence, the term dark chocolate was coined to distinguish the traditional chocolate from its new rival. In the late 20th century, dark chocolate regained popularity due to its superior supposed health benefits over milk chocolate.

Research 
 high-quality clinical research has not been conducted to evaluate the effects of compounds found in cocoa on physiological outcomes, such as blood pressure, for which only small (1–2 mmHg) changes resulted from short-term consumption of chocolate up to 105 grams and 670 milligrams of flavonols per day. Flavanols found in dark chocolate include the monomers catechin and epicatechin, and (to a lesser extent) the polymeric procyanidins, which remain under laboratory research.

Nutrients in dark chocolate include 46% carbohydrates, 43% fats, 8% protein, and 1% water (table). In a  reference serving, dark chocolate provides  of food energy and is a rich source (defined as more than 20% of the Daily Value, DV) of several dietary minerals, such as iron, copper, manganese, magnesium, phosphorus, and zinc. It also contains a moderate amount of vitamin B12 (see table for further statistics).

Chocolate, particularly dark chocolate, may also contain appreciable levels of toxic heavy metals, such as cadmium, which may be present naturally in the soil of cocoa plantations. For products containing over 50% cocoa, the European Commission has set a limit for cadmium of 0.8 mg/kg, while for chocolate containing between 30%-50% cocoa, the limit is 0.3 mg/kg. The state of California recommends a maximum daily intake of 4.1 micrograms of cadmium. According to a Consumer Reports study in 2022, several dark chocolate products were found to contain high levels of lead and cadmium when compared against California's maximum allowable daily dose levels.

See also 

 Raw chocolate
 Baking chocolate
 Fair trade cocoa
 Health effects of chocolate

References 

Types of chocolate